State Route 315, known locally as the Olentangy Freeway, running almost parallel to Olentangy River Road for most of its length, is a north–south highway in central Ohio, in the Columbus metropolitan area.  It may be seen abbreviated as SR 315, OH-315, or simply 315. Its southern terminus is at the south junction of I-70 and I-71 in Columbus, and its northern terminus is at US 23 near Delaware.  It is a controlled access freeway from its southern terminus to I-270. The controlled access section carries two or three lanes in each direction, depending on the location. North of I-270, it becomes a two-lane road. It roughly follows the Olentangy River for about two-thirds of its length. The route passes through The Ohio State University campus. The section between Interstate 670 and Interstate 70 is known as the West Innerbelt, and it is commonly referred to as such in traffic reports.  The original name of this section was Sandusky Street.

Route description

Lawrence E. Hughes Memorial Highway

Running in a north and south direction within Franklin County, commencing at the point where that state route crosses over King Avenue and extending northward to the boundary of Franklin County and Delaware County.

Exit list

State Route 315C

An unsigned State Route 315C exists which begins on the Interstate 670 westbound ramp to Neil Avenue, follows Neil south to the Goodale-Neil Connector and Goodale Avenue, then up Olentangy River Road and onto the ramp to State Route 315 southbound, where it ends. It is clear from the Straight Line Diagram that SR 315C exists westbound only.

References

External links

315
Transportation in Columbus, Ohio
Transportation in Franklin County, Ohio